The 1977 Illinois Fighting Illini football team was an American football team that represented the University of Illinois during the 1977 Big Ten Conference football season.  In their first year under head coach Gary Moeller, the Illini compiled a 3–8 record and finished in ninth place in the Big Ten Conference.

The team's offensive leaders were quarterback Mike McCray with 418 passing yards, running back James Coleman with 715 rushing yards, and wide receiver Tom Schooley with 231 receiving yards. Coleman and linebacker John Sullivan were selected as the team's most valuable players.

Schedule

Roster

References

Illinois
Illinois Fighting Illini football seasons
Illinois Fighting Illini football